Clares is a small village in the Guadalajara province, incorporated since 1969 in the Maranchón municipality, belonging to the Señorio de Molina-Alto Tajo region in the autonomous community of Castilla-La Mancha, Spain.

Geography

Location 
Clares is in the north of the Guadalajara province, 108 km from the provincial capital.

Demography  
The population, as of 1 January 2021, is of 8 inhabitants.

Climate 

The annual average temperature is 8-10 °C, and the average temperature of the hottest month in the summer is less than 25 °C. The total annual amount of precipitation is about 500 mm, with two peaks in spring and autumn.

Orography 
Clares' highest point is the Alto del Monte (1362 m), and its lowest point is in Valdeclares (1280 m). The origin of the Tajuña River is near the village.

Flora 
Clares belongs to the Praramera de Maranchón.

Traditional Celebrations 
 Burning of "el Judas" 
 Virgen del Lluvio (Virgin of the Rain)
 San Roque
 Virgen del Rosario (Virgin of the Rosary)
 El Ojeo (the beating)

Interesting buildings 
 Local Church 
 Ermita de San Roque 
 Ermita de la Virgen del Lluvio 
 Bread oven

How to get to Clares

By Car 
Take exit 135 on road A-2, then enter N211 and continue there 21 km until you reach Maranchón. Then you take road GU-408 to Clares / Codes / Balbacil / Valle del Mesa. Then, 700m later, take GU-407 to Clares / Balbacil. Finally, take the entrance to Clares.

By bus 
The line Madrid / Guadalajara / Teruel / Valencia has a stop in Maranchón, 6 km from Clares.

By train 
The nearest train stations are in Medinaceli (32 km, roads: SO-411, GU-411, N-211, GU-408 y GU-407) and in Arcos de Jalón (30 km, roads: SO-P-3009, GU-405, N-211, GU-408 y GU-407), both of them are on the Madrid - Zaragoza line.

References 

Bibliography
 PÉREZ TABERNERO and BARBA MAYORAL. Historia y tradiciones de Clares Asociación de Vecinos y Amigos de Clares y Ayuntamiento de Maranchón. Maranchón, 1999.

External links 
 https://web.archive.org/web/20141218103726/http://soydeclares.es/ 

Towns in Spain